The Manitoba Limestone is a geologic formation in Manitoba. It preserves fossils dating back to the Devonian period.

See also

 List of fossiliferous stratigraphic units in Manitoba

References
 

Devonian Manitoba